The S11 is a regional railway line of the S-Bahn Zürich on the Zürcher Verkehrsverbund (ZVV), Zürich transportation network. The S11 is one of the network's lines connecting the cantons of Zürich and Aargau.

Route 
 

Line S11 commences at Aarau station, in the canton of Aargau. It follows the Heitersberg line as far as Killwangen-Spreitenbach station, and then the Baden to Zürich line as far as Dietikon station and the approaches to Zürich Hauptbahnhof station. Passing through the lower level platforms at this station, the line then passes through the Hirschengraben and Zürichberg tunnels, and Stettbach station, before joining the Zürich to Winterthur line. The S11 follows this line as far as Winterthur Hauptbahnhof station, running non-stop between Stettbach and Winterthur. From Winterthur it runs either over the Tösstalbahn as far as Sennhof-Kyburg, or over the Winterthur to Etzwilen line as far as Seuzach. During rush hour, trains are extended from Sennhof-Kyburg to Wila.

Trains on the S11 usually run every 30 minutes, with a journey time of around 50 to 92 minutes. The alternation of trains to Sennhof-Kyburg and Seuzach provides an hourly service to each terminus. Service from Dietikon to Aarau is half-hourly at peak times and hourly at off-peak times.

Stations
The following stations are served by the S11.

Stations served by trains on the S11 Aarau branch 
 Aarau
 Lenzburg
 Othmarsingen (served by 1 train per hour and direction)
 Mägenwil
 Mellingen Heitersberg
 Killwangen-Spreitenbach
 Dietikon

Stations served by all S11 trains 
 Dietikon
 Glanzenberg
 Schlieren
 Zürich Altstetten
 Zürich Altstetten
 Zürich Hardbrücke
 Zürich Hauptbahnhof
 Zürich Stadelhofen
 Stettbach
 Winterthur Hauptbahnhof

Stations served by trains on the S11 Seuzach branch 
 Winterthur Hauptbahnhof
 Oberwinterthur
 Winterthur Wallrüti
 Reutlingen
 Seuzach

Stations served by trains on the S11 Sennhof-Kyburg / Wila branch 
 Winterthur Hauptbahnhof
 Winterthur Grüze
 Winterthur Seen
 Sennhof-Kyburg
 Kollbrunn
 Rikon
 Rämismühle-Zell
 Turbenthal
 Wila

Rolling stock 
 all services are operated with RABe 511 class trains.

See also 

 Rail transport in Switzerland
 Trams in Zürich

References

External links 

 ZVV official website: Routes & zones

Zürich S-Bahn lines
Transport in Aargau
Transport in the canton of Zürich